
Year 866 (DCCCLXVI) was a common year starting on Tuesday (link will display the full calendar) of the Julian calendar.

Events 
 By place 

 Byzantine Empire 
 April 21 – Bardas, the regent of the Byzantine Empire, is murdered by Basil the Macedonian at Miletus, while conducting a large-scale expedition against the Saracen stronghold of Crete.

 May 26 – Basil the Macedonian is crowned co-emperor of the Byzantine Empire, and is adopted by the much younger Michael III.

 Europe 
 May 27 – King Ordoño I, ruler of the Kingdom of Asturias, dies after a 16-year reign. He is succeeded by his son, Alfonso III, who later is referred to as  "Alfonso the Great".
 July 2 – Battle of Brissarthe: Frankish forces, led by Robert the Strong, are defeated by a joint Breton-Viking army.
 Louis II, Holy Roman Emperor, defeats the Saracen invaders who are ravaging southern Italy.

 Britain 
 The Great Heathen Army of the Vikings rides north to Northumbria. The Northumbrians are preoccupied with a civil war, and the Danes enter York unopposed.

 Abbasid Caliphate 
 October 17 – Caliph al-Musta'in is put to death, after a 4-year reign. He is succeeded by al-Mu'tazz, who becomes the youngest Abbasid caliph to assume power.
 The Kharijite revolt against the Abbasid Caliphate begins in Al-Jazira (Upper Mesopotamia), which will last for 30 years.

 Japan 
 Fujiwara no Yoshifusa becomes regent (sesshō) to assist the child emperor Seiwa, starting the Fujiwara regency.

 By topic 

 Religion 
 Boris I, ruler (knyaz) of the Bulgarian Empire, sends a diplomatic mission, led by the Bulgarian nobleman Peter, to Rome, in an effort to renew ties with the West.
 Pope Nicholas I forbids the use of torture, in prosecutions for witchcraft (approximate date).

Births 
 June 10 – Uda, emperor of Japan (d. 931)
 September 19 – Leo VI, Byzantine emperor (d. 912)
 Carloman II, king of the West Frankish Kingdom (approximate date)
 Robert I, king of the West Frankish Kingdom (d. 923)
 Yao Yi, chancellor of Later Tang (d. 940)

Deaths 
 April 21 – Bardas, Byzantine chief minister and regent
 May 27 – Ordoño I, king of Asturias
 June 21 – Rodulf, Frankish archbishop
 July 2 – Robert the Strong, Frankish nobleman
 July 16 – Irmgard, Frankish abbess
 October 17 – Al-Musta'in, Abbasid caliph
 Adelaide of Tours, Frankish noblewoman
 Al-Mu'ayyad, Abbasid prince
 Charles the Child, king of Aquitaine
 Eberhard, duke of Friuli
 Emenon, Frankish nobleman
 Hungerus Frisus, bishop of Utrecht
 Linji Yixuan, Chinese monk and founder of the Linji school
 Liudolf, duke of Saxony
 Ranulf I, Frankish nobleman (b. 820)
 Robert, Frankish nobleman (b. 834)
 Rudolph, Frankish nobleman
 Wang Shaoyi, general of the Tang Dynasty
 Yahya ibn Yahya, Idrisid emir of Morocco

References